Eodiaphyodus is a genus of Elopiformes fish that is classified in the suborder Albuloidea. It is related to the modern Tarpon. This fish lived in what is now Morocco during the Late Cretaceous Period. It crushed its food with bony plates found in the back of its throat.

Classification

Species
Eodiaphyodus granulosus

See also
Coriops
Flora and fauna of the Maastrichtian stage
List of prehistoric bony fish (Osteichthyes)

References 

Prehistoric ray-finned fish genera
Cretaceous bony fish
Elopiformes
Fossils of Morocco